Thurman "Fum" McGraw (July 17, 1927 – September 13, 2000) was an American football player and college athletics administrator.  He played college football at Colorado A&M (now known as Colorado State University) and was inducted into the College Football Hall of Fame in 1981.

Biography
McGraw was born in Garden City, Kansas. At Paonia High School, he won four letters in basketball, three each in football and baseball and was the Western Slope heavyweight-boxing champion. Standing 6'5" and weighing 235 lbs., McGraw was fresh from action with the U.S. Marine Corps in World War II when he enrolled at Colorado State University in 1946, when it was known as Colorado A&M. Working diligently at his game, McGraw called upon lessons learned as a boxer and wrestler to fashion himself into a special breed of football player. His arm strength was crushing to opposing players and his agility developed through wrestling served him well when fending off opposing linemen. Colorado A&M finished 2–7 in McGraw's freshman season, but things would change quickly. As a sophomore, McGraw helped his Rams post a 5–4–1 mark, the team's best record in 11 years. Then, in 1948, the Aggies posted upsets over rivals Utah State, Wyoming, BYU and archrival Colorado. The 1949 campaign, McGraw's last as a four-year letterman, saw the Aggies log a 9–1 record marred only by a loss to Wyoming. After graduation, McGraw joined the Detroit Lions and captured Rookie of the Year and All-Pro honors. In 1981, he was inducted into the College Football Hall of Fame.

While at Colorado State, McGraw was the school's first football All-American in 1949. When he returned to CSU in later years as a staff member, he also served as the athletic director from 1976 to 1986.

References

External links
 
 

1927 births
2000 deaths
American football defensive tackles
American football tackles
Colorado State Rams athletic directors
Colorado State Rams football players
Detroit Lions players
College Football Hall of Fame inductees
Western Conference Pro Bowl players
United States Marine Corps personnel of World War II
United States Marines
People from Paonia, Colorado
People from Garden City, Kansas
Players of American football from Colorado